Maximiliano Fabian Álvarez (born 6 February 1982) is a former Argentine footballer.

Career statistics

Club

Notes

References

1982 births
Living people
Argentine footballers
Argentine expatriate footballers
Association football forwards
Racing de Olavarría footballers
Deportivo Toluca F.C. players
Persipura Jayapura players
Chirag United Club Kerala players
A.S.D. Città di Marino Calcio players
Club Real Potosí players
Torneo Argentino A players
Expatriate footballers in Mexico
Argentine expatriate sportspeople in Mexico
Expatriate footballers in Venezuela
Argentine expatriate sportspeople in Venezuela
Expatriate footballers in Indonesia
Argentine expatriate sportspeople in Indonesia
Expatriate footballers in India
Expatriate footballers in Chile
Argentine expatriate sportspeople in Chile
Expatriate footballers in Italy
Argentine expatriate sportspeople in Italy
Expatriate footballers in Bolivia
Argentine expatriate sportspeople in Bolivia
Footballers from Rosario, Santa Fe